The Koreshan Unity was a communal utopia formed by Cyrus Teed, a distant relative of Joseph Smith, founder of the Latter Day Saint movement. The Koreshans followed Teed's beliefs, called Koreshanity, and he was regarded by his adherents as "the new Messiah now in the World". After moving from New York to Illinois, the group eventually settled in Estero, Florida. The last person to officially admit membership to the Koreshans died in 1982.

Founding
The Koreshan Unity started in the 1870s in New York City, where Teed started preaching his beliefs. Teed took the name "Koresh" from the original Persian form of his name Cyrus.

He formed short-lived groups in New York City and Moravia, New York. After finding it hard to find converts in New York, he moved to Chicago in 1886. Teed's followers formed a commune in Chicago in 1888 called Beth-Ophra. Koreshan affiliated "study groups" also appeared in Baltimore, Portland, San Francisco, Springfield and Lynn, Massachusetts, and elsewhere.

Beliefs
The Koreshan Unity, led by Cyrus Teed, was a religious cult that followed the ideals of celibacy, community, and equality to attain immortality. Teed described God as a hybrid of male and female. Due to this belief, he and the cult as a whole were very open to feminism and the equality between the sexes. The ruling body of the Unity was the Planetary Court; it was composed exclusively of females aside from Teed as the leader of the Court. 

Celibacy, according to Teed, was the guiding principle humans should live by in order to attain immortality. Teed preached that women were slaves in their marriages and a way for them to be liberated was to move to the commune and practice celibacy, which was very appealing to women at the time. 

Teed denounced commercialism and wished for the Unity to eschew personal property. However, archaeological research has shown that some members did keep private keepsakes and an iron-key was discovered, showing that even if the Koreshans called for communal ownership, some places or things were off limits. The group was also known to sell excess goods to locals who lived outside the commune.

The Unity also believed in a concave hollow Earth. They thought the world was on the inside crust of the planet and the sky was the inside of the earth. Teed backed this up with a device he invented called the "Rectilineator" which measured how the earth's surface was concave rather than round.

Membership levels
There was a tri-level system of membership.  
The outer level was made up of non-believers who were willing to work for the Unity.  This group was called the Patrons of Equation, and allowed for marriage and participation in the secular aspects of the unity.  
The middle group, the Department of Equitable Administration, allowed for marriage, but sexual relationships were only to be for the purpose of reproduction.  
The inner, core, group (called The Pre-Eminent Unity) was the Celibate and Communal group, which did not allow marriage and practiced celibacy.    
Within each of these three levels were three distinct branches, the Secular System, the Commercial System, and the Educational System, with a total of nine groups.

Community
Eventually, Teed took his followers to Estero, Florida, to form his "New Jerusalem" in 1894. The community was at its peak 1903–1908, when it had over 250 residents. There were apparently another 4,000 believers around the country. Membership declined following his death in 1908.

The group built extensively, establishing a bakery, printing house (publishing their newspaper and other publications), the "World College of Life", a general store, concrete works, power plant (supplying power to the surrounding area years before it was available elsewhere in the region) and more. The colony was extensively landscaped. The Unity also owned a home on Estero Island, called La Parita. The house, on the bay side of the island, was where Teed would end up passing away.

There has been work to document and preserve the grounds in Estero (a Florida State Park).

Political party
In 1906, the community formed the Progressive Liberal Party to run several candidates for county government against the local Democratic Party but were never successful. This Progressive Liberal Party consisted of Koreshans, socialists, Republicans, and dissatisfied Democrats. The Koreshans had already incorporated Estero and were seeking further political power in Lee County.  After Teed died in 1908 the group went into decline.  Several groups split off from the Unity.  One such group was the Order of Theocracy that left in 1910 and moved to nearby Ft. Myers. This group lasted until 1931.  The fact the Unity was celibate did not help, although celibacy was not the real problem since there was a married status within the Unity.  Celibates were the highest order.  Without new members joining, the group slowly dwindled.  It continued to publish the Flaming Sword until the printing press burned down in 1949.  It also published the American Eagle, which began in 1906 and later became a horticultural newspaper.

Followers
The last remaining follower, Hedwig Michel, joined in 1940.  She had learned of the Koreshans in Germany, and fled Nazi persecution.  She ceded the main portion of the commune grounds to Florida to form a state park in 1961.  The Koreshan State Park (now known as the Koreshan State Historic Site) was opened in 1967. Hedwig Michel continued to live in the building known as the "Planetary Court."  She died in 1981. She is the only Koreshan buried within the park. Two other Koreshan cemeteries are nearby, one of which lies within a gated community and the other on land owned by the Audubon Society.  Partly due to the Koreshan belief in a form of reincarnation, little, if anything, was done to care for these cemeteries.  The only permanent grave stones were put in by family members.

College
The College of Life Foundation, formerly the Koreshan Unity Foundation, is now the owner/caretaker of the remaining Koreshan land and the extensive archives. After Michel's death, control of the Koreshan Unity Foundation passed to her secretary, Jo Bigelow, and most recently another individual, Charles Dauray. None of those controlling the College of Life Foundation are Koreshan believers.

Footnotes

Further reading
 Adams, Katherine J. Life Inside the Earth: The Koreshan Unity and Its Urban Pioneers, 1880-1908. MA thesis. Florida State University, 2010.
Brumann, Christoph. "The Dominance of One and Its Perils: Charismatic Leadership and Branch Structures in Utopian Communes," Journal of Anthropological Research, vol. 56, no. 4 (Winter 2000), pp. 425–451.
Fine, Howard D. "The Koreshan Unity: The Chicago Years of a Utopian Community," Journal of the Illinois State Historical Society, vol. 68, no. 3 (June 1975), pp. 213–227.
Landing, James E. "Cyrus Reed Teed and the Koreshan Unity," in Donald E. Pitzer (ed.), America's Communal Utopias. Chapel Hill, NC: University of North Carolina Press, 2010; pp. 375–395.
Mackle, Elliott. "Cyrus Teed and the Lee County Elections of 1906," Florida Historical Quarterly, vol. 57, no. 1 (July 1978), pp. 1–18.
Rea, Sara W. The Koreshan Story, Koreshan Unity Foundation, Inc, 1994.
Rosenthal, Odeda. Hedwig Michel: The Patron Saint of The Koreshan State Historic Site, Koreshan Unity Foundation, Inc, 1992.

External links

Koreshan State Historic Site, official web page.
Unofficial Koreshan State Historic Site, unofficial web page.
Koreshan Historical Collection, Digital Collection of photos, letters and documents from the Koreshan settlement in Southwest Florida. Maintained by the Florida Gulf Coast University Library.
American Communal Utopias and The Koreshan Unity: A Bibliography Brief overview and bibliography of works, slightly dated.
Turning the Universe Inside-Out: Ulysses Grant Morrow's Naples Experiment, Examination of the Naples Experiment, and why it failed.
https://www.lockhaven.edu/~dsimanek/hollow/morrow.htm The Startling Testimony of Plumb-Lines]
Ohnemus, Catherine A. Anthony. Dr. Cyrus Teed and the Koreshan Unity Movement

Communalism
New religious movements
Utopian communities in the United States
Religion in the United States
1870s establishments in New York (state)
1981 disestablishments in the United States